Simon Jack Astaire (born 1961) is a novelist, screenwriter, media advisor, film producer.

Early life
Astaire is the son of stockbroker Edgar Astaire and his former wife interior designer Lesley (née Berman), who was subsequently the first wife of artist Bill Jacklin. He was educated at Wellesley House School in Kent, and at Harrow School. His uncle was the boxing promoter Jarvis Astaire.

Career
Astaire was recruited by the talent agency International Creative Management (ICM) UK, where he became the youngest agent yet to be employed by the firm. During his ten-year career as head of young artists (clients included Oscar Winner Rachel Weisz) and international signings at ICM, Simon established a thriving music department.

In 1997 he became Chief Executive of Protocol Multimedia with diverse media divisions that included personal representation, product and celebrity endorsement and PR, working with companies such as Bvlgari, Giorgio Armani, Calvin Klein, Alfred Dunhill and Saatchi & Saatchi. Charlize Theron was contracted to Bvlgari as Lady Helen Taylor was to Armani and Calvin Klein. Astaire negotiated an unprecedented deal between writer Fay Weldon and Bvlgari; she was commissioned to write a novel The Bvlgari Connection in what was the first commission of its kind.

Among Astaire's clients are members of the Hollywood establishment and the British Royal Family, including Prince and Princess Michael of Kent.

Astaire appears as a pundit regularly on CNN, Sky News, Five and other networks commenting upon all key media and celebrity stories.

Publications
His first novel, Private Privilege, was published in 2008 by Quartet Books. The story is a rite of passage through the eyes of a public schoolboy. The sequel And You Are? was published the following year. It is set in Hollywood, Las Vegas and London. His third novel, Mr Coles, was published in May 2011. It takes place in an English Prep School and follows the tortured life of one of its masters. It was described in one review as "illuminating the dark alleys of the human condition". His fourth novel, The Last Photograph, is set on 21 December 1988; the day Pan Am Flight 103 crashed into Lockerbie. It was Hello Magazine's book of the week and the review described it as being 'emotionally eloquent and a searing study of loss and love.' His first authorized biography is of soccer star Sol Campbell. It was published in March 2014 and was serialized in The Sunday Times. The biography became The Times critic's choice of the week. Astaire was nominated as the best 'new' writer at The Best Sports Book Awards of the Year 2015. 
In September 2018, a regular feature called Station to Station began in The Sunday Telegraph. Simon Astaire's concept is asking his guest 12 questions whilst they take an imaginary train journey of their choice.  His first guest was Ian Holm and he chose Paris to Antibes. It was Ian Holm's last interview. His daily blog 'Letters to my daughter' began in March 2020 through World Press.
In 2021, Astaire and the British artist Bill Jacklin worked together to create Cressida's Dream. The story of a father and daughter mixed with the cautionary tale of a world on the edge of apocalypse. The book was published in December 2021.

Film
Astaire co-produced the movie The Last Photograph based on his novel of the same title. He also wrote the screenplay. The film was shot in Central London and Lockerbie, Scotland. It is directed by Danny Huston and stars Danny Huston, Sarita Choudhury, Stacy Martin. The world premiere was at the Edinburgh Film Festival in June 2017. It was shortlisted for The Michael Powell Award for Best British Feature Film. Its first US screening was at Mill Valley Film Festival in October 2107. The film was released at selected theaters in the United States on 6 September 2019 and available on all on the major platforms. The critic Joan Lowerison wrote," "Simon Astaire's brilliantly-written script offers sudden time shifts, black-and-white and color shots, even some blurry shots, and sudden unnerving emotional outbursts illustrating Tom's interior struggle."
The film got its UK release in April 2021.

Personal life
Astaire has a son, Milo, with his former partner, model Saffron Aldridge. and a daughter Paloma with Pilar Ordovas. They married in  New York City in 2018 .

References

External links
 "While sophisticated in many of the ways of the world, I don’t think that he's ever been east of Sloane Square." - Sting about Simon Astaire.

1961 births
Living people
People educated at Harrow School
21st-century British novelists
People from Paddington
British public relations people
Writers from London